Cyanophora paradoxa is a freshwater species of Glaucophyte that is used as a model organism.   C. paradoxa has two cyanelles or chloroplasts where photosynthesis occurs. Cyanelles are unusual organelles in that they retain a rudimentary peptidoglycan wall. The cyanelle genome of C. paradoxa strain LB 555 was sequenced and published in 1995. The nuclear genome was also sequenced and published in 2012.

Description
Cyanophora paradoxa is a unicellular organism with two flagella, attached near the tip of the cell. The cell body is about 7-15 μm long by 3-6 μm wide; it is roughly ovoid (egg-shaped) in shape, and is covered in ridges that outline triangular or crescent-shaped "fenestrations". Each cell generally has one or two cyanelles.

References

Archaeplastida
Species described in 1924